Fiji competed at the 2014 Summer Youth Olympics, in Nanjing, China from 16 August to 28 August 2014.

Medalists

Athletics

Fiji qualified two athletes.

Qualification Legend: Q=Final A (medal); qB=Final B (non-medal); qC=Final C (non-medal); qD=Final D (non-medal); qE=Final E (non-medal)

Boys
Track & road events

Girls
Track & road events

Field Hockey

Fiji qualified a girls' team based on its performance at the Oceania Qualification Tournament.

Girls' Tournament

Roster

 Taraivini Bennion
 Lora Bukalidi
 Tiara Dutta
 Adi Naselesele
 Ro Ratumaimuri
 Lala Ravatu
 Ro Silatolu
 Temo Tikoitoga
 Ateca Tinaisalasalavonu

Group Stage

Ninth and tenth place

Rugby Sevens

Fiji qualified a boys' team based on its performance at the 2013 Rugby World Cup Sevens.

Boys' Tournament

Roster

 Josaia Cokaibusa
 Waisea Daroko
 Timoci Meya
 Ratu Nawabalavu
 Sailasa Powell
 Alipate Qaraniqio
 Filipe Qoro
 Navitalai Ralawa
 Joseva Rauga
 Semi Tabacule
 Ratu Uluiviti
 Eminoni Vuidravuwalu

Group Stage

Semifinal

Bronze Medal Match

Swimming

Fiji qualified one swimmer.

Boys

Weightlifting

Fiji qualified 1 quota in the boys' and girls' events based on the team ranking after the 2014 Weightlifting Oceania Championships.

Boys

Girls

References

2014 in Fijian sport
Nations at the 2014 Summer Youth Olympics
Fiji at the Youth Olympics